Mexican Slayride is a 1967 Eurospy film directed by Riccardo Freda and starring Lang Jeffries. It is based on the Paul Kenny's novel Coplan fait peau neuve and it is the fifth chapter in the Francis Coplan film series.

Plot

Cast 
  Lang Jeffries as Francis Coplan
 Sabine Sun as The Countess 
 José María Caffarel  as  Langis
 Robert Party  as  le vieux
  Frank Oliveras as  Fondane
 Guido Lollobrigida  as Montez
 Guy Marly as Dr. Krauz
  Luciana Gilli as  Maya
 Silvia Solar as  Francine
 Osvaldo Genazzani

Release
Mexican Slayride was first released in France on 10 February 1967 where it was distributed theatrically by C.F.F.P. It later was distributed in Italy by Fida on 29 July 1967 as well as being released theatrically in Spain on 11 August 1967.

References

Footnotes

Sources

External links

Italian spy thriller films
French spy thriller films
Spanish spy thriller films
1960s spy thriller films
Films directed by Riccardo Freda
1960s French films
1960s Italian films